Sokhel is a village and former Village Development Committee that is now part of Dakshinkali Municipality in Kathmandu District in Province No. 3 of central Nepal. At the time of the 1991 Nepal census it had a population of 3,980 and had 684 households in it.

References

Populated places in Kathmandu District